Ashareh may refer to:
 Ashareh-ye Bozorg, Ahvaz County
 Ashareh-ye Kuchek, Ahvaz County
 Ashareh-ye Olya, Omidiyeh County
 Ashareh-ye Sofla, Omidiyeh County